Open Secrets is a solo bass album by Peter Kowald. It was recorded in January 1988 at the FMP Studio in Berlin, and was released on LP later that year by the FMP label. FMP reissued the album on CD in 2008.

Reception

The authors of the Penguin Guide to Jazz Recordings called the album "a remarkable record," and stated: "though the technical range is impressive... it never draws attention to itself... but makes a steady progress through areas that sound predetermined but which are encountered according to chance-driven logic that throws up challenging transitions and juxtapositions."

In a review for All About Jazz, Nic Jones wrote: "Open Secrets presents the sound of a formidable technician without letting that dubious asset get in the way of musical expression. The results are compelling... He exploits not only the double-bass' standard vocabulary but also extraneous noises too, making for a compact statement of its potential as a solo instrument."

Writing for Point of Departure, Francesco Martinelli commented: "There are so many different things going on on this recording that time flashes by and at the end one cannot wait to hear it again... Pump up the volume in order to fully appreciate the dark, resonant sound of Peter Kowald's bass (and voice) in this exceptional snapshot of his life and art."

Bill Meyer of Dusted Magazine wrote: "Open Secrets... is so much more communicative than your average free improv solo recital. You can hear a world of experience boiled down to what can be sounded within a curved wooden box and four big strings... this record's nine tracks are marvelously focused, the musical ideas succinctly articulated, the soul behind them ever evident... There's a calm in these performances that contrasts with the frenzy elsewhere in Kowald's discography and makes it feel even more special."

In an article for Paris Transatlantic, Clifford Allen remarked: "Each of these vignettes contains a heavy dose of personality, and you can hear Kowald the human being throughout. Man, fingers, arms, bow, strings, and two large bodies unifying in sonic space – how much more open can you get?"

Track listing
All compositions by Peter Kowald.

Side A
 "Peek At World" – 6:01
 "Languages Differentes" – 5:18
 "Vita Povera - Arte No" – 2:36
 "El Mismo Rio" – 4:18
 "Welt Um (Wale)" – 1:18

Side B
 "Open Secrets" – 8:35
 "Watu Wote" – 6:34
 "Archaion Mellon" – 3:05
 "Ima Samu Dessu (Mi Tsu Ni)" – 2:35

Personnel 
 Peter Kowald – bass

References

1988 albums
Peter Kowald albums
FMP/Free Music Production albums